Belcești is a commune in Iași County, Western Moldavia, Romania, situated on the Bahlui River 44 km from Iași. One of the county's largest communes, with a population of 10,555 in 2011, it is composed of six villages: Belcești, Liteni, Munteni, Satu Nou, Tansa, and Ulmi.

Belcești is situated at 45 km from Iași, on the Iași-Podu Iloaei-Hârlău line.

In the vicinity of Belcești, the important Tansa-Belcești dam was built on the Bahlui River in order to prevent flooding. Most Belcești residents work in agriculture, with fishing another livelihood.

History
Belcești was first mentioned in historical documents in 1420. Belcești's citizens appear again in the historical documents of Moldavia on April 5, 1448, under the reign of Petru Mușat. On May 12, 1489, Belcești appears in the historical documents of Moldavia with the royal church and court between the villages given by Stephen the Great to the boyars Negrescu and Ivașcu.

In the documents that are at the State Archives of Iași, we find mentioned that the ruler Petru Șchiopu at 4 February 1579 gives the village of Belcești with all the mills, to the Monastery Of Galata in Iași. Another village component of the commune, Ulmi, was also given by Petru Șchiopu to the Monastery of St. Paraskevi in Iasi, but the first document of giving was not preserved. So it is that the first mention about the village of Ulmi appears On August 2, 1597, during the reign of Ieremie Movilă.

This documentary attestation is preceded by various vestiges belonging to older times, such as the coins discovered in Belcești during the reign of Alexander the Good (1400-1432). In the documents arrived to us, it is specified that the decision of these villages was preserved "from the age" suggesting the idea that at the time of their elaboration the villages were old.

At first, at its appearance, Belcești was situated at east of the current village Ulmi, and between 1805 and 1820 a part of the inhabitants moved to the left side of Bahlui river forming the village Văleni — the other villages being formed by impropriety and swarming.

References

 România - ghid turistic. Editura Sport-turism, 1983.
 România - Atlas geografic.

Communes in Iași County
Localities in Western Moldavia